Rhyw Fath o Ynfytyn is a 2012 Welsh novel written by Lleucu Roberts. The novel focuses on the disorderly effects love has on relationships. The specific relationship brought up by this story is that of proud Welsh nationalist Efa and her 15-year old daughter Ceri, who causes sparks to fly when she brings home her boyfriend, whose political views contrast with her own. The book was published by Y Lolfa.

References

Welsh-language novels
2012 British novels